The Atlantic Salmon Federation (ASF) is an international conservation organization established in 1948.

The Federation is dedicated to the conservation, protection and restoration of wild Atlantic salmon and the ecosystems on which their well being and survival depend.

ASF's headquarters are in St. Andrews, New Brunswick, Canada, with regional offices in each of the Atlantic provinces, Quebec, and Maine.

ASF has a network of seven regional councils (New Brunswick, Nova Scotia, Newfoundland and Labrador, Prince Edward Island, Quebec, Maine and Western New England), which cover the freshwater range of wild Atlantic salmon in Canada and the United States.

References

External links 

 

Environmental organizations based in New Brunswick
Fish conservation organizations
Organizations established in 1948
1948 establishments in New Brunswick
Salmon restoration